This is a list of notable pubs in Australia. A pub (in Australia) is an establishment performing many functions. These include serving alcoholic beverages, meals, functioning as a venue for various kinds of entertainment, and, sometimes, providing basic accommodation.

History 

The Australian pub is a direct descendant of the British and Irish pub. The production and consumption of alcoholic drinks has long played a key role in Western social life and commerce, and this is reflected in the importance of pubs after the British colonisation of Australia began in 1788. However, in the 19th century the local version evolved a number of distinctive features that set it apart from the classic British or urban Irish pub.

The lack of public buildings in rural towns in colonial Australia saw pubs serve as community meeting places for a range of local activities. Among other things, they served as a community hall, a venue for political meetings and a place where inquests were held.

Early pubs followed the English pattern and were located in the front room of a domestic dwelling. The room in this "public house" were furnished with a bar, tables and benches, and there was often sawdust on the floor. They functioned under long established rules and regulations that governed every aspect of their operations. These required the publican to be of good character and pay an annual license fee. Regulations also specified hours of opening, who might and might not be served, the quality of drinks sold and mandated the provision of street lighting outside the entrance. Police and magistrates enforced these rules strictly, with fines and a possible loss of license for repeat offenders.

Early pubs were distinct from hotels, inns and large city centre pubs, which tended to be larger and more elaborate purpose-built establishments with a basement and one or more upper floors. As well as a tap-room, or public bar, they often provided a range of other facilities, such as accommodation, a dining room, stables, parlour and a billiard room.

Some tough inner-city pubs had a reputation for violence and disorder. In Australian slang, they might be referred to as a bloodhouse.

Pubs in Australia

Australian Capital Territory 
Harmonie German Club
Old Canberra Inn
The Durham Castle Arms

New South Wales 
Current

 Argyle Stores, Sydney
 Australian Hotel, Sydney
 Bald Rock Hotel
 Box Hill Inn
 Bristol Arms Hotel, Sydney
 British Seamen's Hotel, Sydney
 Brooklyn Hotel, The Rocks
 Bushranger Hotel
 Campbell's Stores, Sydney
 Captain Cook Hotel
 Carlisle Castle Hotel
 Commercial Hotel, Albury
 Crown Hotel, Sydney
 Dick's Hotel
 Dry Dock Hotel
 Dundee Arms Hotel, Sydney
 Eatons Group
 Ettamogah Pub, Albury
 Ettamogah Pub, Kellyville
 Exchange Hotel, Balmain, Sydney
 Fanny's Tavern
 Fortune of War Hotel
 Glenmore Hotel
 Harbour Rocks Hotel
 Harbour View Hotel, Sydney
 Harts Buildings
 Heritage Hotel, Bulli
 Hero of Waterloo Hotel, Sydney
 Hydro Majestic Hotel
 Lord Nelson Hotel, Sydney
 Milestone Hotel, Dubbo
 New Albury Hotel
 Newport Arms Hotel
 Old Sir Joseph Banks Hotel
 One Tree Hotel
 The Oriental Hotel
 Palace Hotel, Broken Hill
 Railway Hotel, Bogan Gate
 Rising Sun Inn, Millfield
 Riverview Hotel, Balmain
 Royal Cricketers Arms Inn
 Royal Hotel, Bathurst
 Royal Hotel, Cooma
 Royal Oak Hotel
 Sandringham Hotel, Newtown
 Slip Inn
 Sussex Hotel, Sydney
 White Horse Hotel, Surry Hills
 Sir William Wallace Hotel
 UNSW Venues

Defunct

 Albion Hotel, Balmain
 Albion Hotel, Braidwood
 Arcadia Hotel, Sydney
 Australia Hotel (defunct)
 Beach Hotel, Rozelle
 Bogan Gate Hotel
 Bridge View Inn
 Brown's Family Hotel
 Carrington Hotel, Katoomba
 Court House Hotel, Windsor
 Eatons Group
 Forth & Clyde Hotel
 Fortune of War Hotel, Sydney
 The Garibaldi, Sydney
 George Hotel, Sydney
 Grand Hotel, Broadway
 Imperial Hotel, Rooty Hill
 Kent Hotel
 Metropolitan Hotel, Sydney
 Rising Sun Inn, Millfield
 Royal George Hotel, Sydney
 Royal Oak Arms Hotel
 Nubrygyn Inn and Cemetery
 Shipwright's Arms Hotel
 Star Hotel, Balmain
 Victoria Hotel, Hinton
 Volunteer Hotel
 Whalers Arms Hotel
 White Bay Hotel
 Young Princess Hotel

Northern Territory 
Hotel Darwin
Humpty Doo Hotel
Victoria Hotel, Darwin

Queensland 

 Babinda State Hotel
 Barrier Reef Hotel
 Barron Valley Hotel
 Bellevue Hotel, Brisbane
 Birdsville Hotel
 Bloomfield Lodge
 Bowen River Hotel
 Breakfast Creek Hotel
 Broadway Hotel, Woolloongabba
 Buchanan's Hotel
 Cairns Court House Complex
 Canberra Hotel, Brisbane
 Central Hotel, Cairns
 Central Hotel, Stanthorpe
 City View Hotel
 Cleveland Hotel
 Coronation Hotel
 Criterion Hotel, Maryborough
 Criterion Hotel, Rockhampton
 Criterion Hotel, Warwick
 Customs House Hotel, Maryborough
 Dusit Thani Brookwater Golf and Spa Resort
 Eatons Hill Hotel
 Einasleigh Hotel
 Empire Hotel, Fortitude Valley
 Engineers' Arms Hotel
 Eureka Hotel
 Exchange Hotel, Laidley
 Exchange Hotel, Mossman
 Federal Hotel, Childers
 Forest Hill Hotel
 Fortitude Valley Post Office
 Four Points by Sheraton Brisbane
 Gambaro Group
 Grand Hotel, Childers
 Grand Hotel, Mount Morgan
 Grand View Hotel
 Great Northern Hotel, Townsville
 Heritage Hotel
 Hides Hotel
 Holiday Inn, Townsville
 Hotel Cecil (Southport)
 Hotel Cecil, North Ipswich
 Hotel Childers
 Hotel Corones
 Hotel Francis
 Hotel Metropole, Ipswich
 Imperial Hotel, Ravenswood
 Inchcolm, Spring Hill
 Irlam's Ant Bed Building
 Jubilee Hotel
 Lake Eacham Hotel
 Lakes Creek Hotel
 Langham Hotel, Warwick
 Lees Hotel
 Lockyer Hotel
 Mana Bar
 Manor Apartment Hotel
 Marburg Hotel
 National Hotel, Warwick
 Nebo Hotel
 Nindigully Pub
 Noccundra Hotel
 Norman Hotel
 Normanby Hotel
 Oddfellows Home Hotel
 Orient Hotel, Brisbane
 Palace Hotel, Childers
 Palazzo Versace Australia
 Parson's Inn
 People's Palace, Brisbane
 Plough Inn
 Port Office Hotel
 Post Office Hotel, Maryborough
 Prince Consort Hotel
 Quartz Hill Coach Change Station
 Queen's Hotel, Townsville
 Queensland National Hotel
 Railway Hotel, Gympie
 Railway Hotel, Ravenswood
 Range Hotel site, Hervey Range
 Regatta Hotel
 Royal Bull's Head Inn
 Royal Exchange Hotel, Brisbane
 Royal George Hotel and Ruddle's Building
 Royal Hotel, Birdsville
 Royal Hotel, Maryborough
 Royal Mail Hotel, Hungerford
 Shell House, Brisbane
 Sheraton Mirage Port Douglas Resort
 Stonehouse, Moore
 Tattersalls Hotel, Townsville
 The Grand Hotel, Hughenden
 The Pink Poodle
 The Reef Hotel Casino
 The Star Gold Coast
 Towers of Chevron Renaissance
 Transcontinental Hotel
 Treasury Casino
 Treasury Hotel
 Ulster Hotel
 Victoria Park Hotel
 Victory Hotel
 Waterloo Bay Hotel
 West End Hotel, Townsville
 White Horse Hotel, Toowoomba
 White Swan Inn, Swan Creek
 Wickham Hotel

South Australia 
 Exeter Hotel
 Highercomb Hotel
 Largs Pier Hotel
 Pier Hotel, Glenelg

Tasmania 
The Bush Inn, Tasmania
Hope and Anchor Tavern
The Deloraine Hotel

Victoria 

 Carlton Inn, Melbourne
 Corner Hotel, Richmond
 Colbinabbin Hotel – Colbinabbin 3559
 Devonshire Arms, Fitzroy (defunct)
 Diggers Rest Hotel (defunct)
 Duke of Wellington, Melbourne
 Empress Hotel, Fitzroy North (defunct)
 Esplanade Hotel
 Fawkner's Hotel (defunct)
 Federal Hotel, Melbourne (defunct)
 The Gordon Hotel – Portland 3305
 Governor Hotham Hotel, Hawthorn
 Hotel Windsor
 The Elphinstone Hotel 3448
 Greendale Hotel – Greendale 3341
 Prince of Wales Hotel, St Kilda
 Punters Club (defunct)
 Old White Hart Hotel, Spring St, Melbourne (defunct)
 Radio Springs Hotel, Lyonville
 Shamrock Hotel, Bendigo
 The Tote Hotel
 Tudor Inn, Cheltenham
 Young and Jackson Hotel

Western Australia 

Exchange Hotel, Kalgoorlie
Federal Hotel, Fremantle
Melbourne Hotel
Palace Hotel, Perth
Parkerville Tavern, Perth
Railway Hotel, Perth
Raffles Hotel, Perth
Royal Hotel, Perth
Sail and Anchor Hotel
Freemasons Tavern, Beverley

Fictional 
 Ettamogah Pub

Australian pubs worldwide 

There are an estimated 3,000 Australian themed pubs worldwide. They have been criticised for a lack of authenticity. They are particularly prevalent wherever Australian tourists or expatriate communities are found, providing a sense of connection for the Australian diaspora.

Walkabout (pub chain)
Café Oz Australian Bar

See also 
 List of bars
 List of hotels in Australia
 List of microbreweries
 List of public house topics
 Longest bar in Australia
 Micropub

References 

 
Lists of companies of Australia
Australia
Australian cuisine-related lists
Lists of buildings and structures in Australia